Actinopus fractus is a species of mygalomorph spiders in the family Actinopodidae. It is found Brazil.

References

fractus
Spiders described in 1920